MMT (formerly called M2M) is the Eclipse implementation of the OMG QVT standard (the Eclipse foundation is now a member of OMG as of January 2007). MMT is a subproject of Eclipse Modeling Project (EMP).

Three components are available for model to model transformations: 
ATL (ATLAS Transformation Language) from INRIA
Procedural QVT, from Borland
Declarative QVT, from Obeo

Implementations announced by Obeo and Borland should be available in the near future.

External links
 MMT Project home page
 M2M newsgroup : Updated information is available from the corresponding newsgroup, providing latest news on the evolution of the three implementations and of bridges between them.

Specification languages